These are the results of the 1988 Ibero-American Championships in Athletics which took place from 22 to 24 July 1988 at Estadio Olímpico in Ciudad de México, Mexico.

Different versions of the sprint results were published, because the fully automatic electronic timing system was malfunctioning.  The first version displayed below on the left hand side was officially used to determine the athletes qualifying for the finals (best times, q).  Later, there was a second version (not displayed).  In December 1988, British statistician Richard Hymans published a revised version for the IAAF and the ATFS where many times were corrected.  These numbers are displayed below in parentheses.  Finally, there were a couple of hand timing results (Heat 1, 110m hurdles men, Heat 1 and 2 200m women; also displayed below in parentheses), because the officials noticed a defect in the electronic timing system during the event.

Men's results

100 meters

Heat 1 – 22 July
Wind: +0.7 m/s

Heat 2 – 22 July
Wind: +2.7 m/s

Heat 3 – 22 July
Wind: +1.6 m/s

Final – 22 July
Wind: +1.2 m/s

Extra – 22 July
Wind: 0.0 m/s

200 meters

Heat 1 – 23 July
Wind: +1.5 m/s

Heat 2 – 23 July
Wind: +1.8 m/s

Heat 3 – 23 July
Wind: +0.0 m/s

Final – 23 July
Wind: -0.3 m/s

Extra – 23 July
Wind: +0.0 m/s

400 meters

Heat 1 – 22 July

Heat 2 – 22 July

Heat 3 – 22 July

Final – 22 July

Extra – 22 July

800 meters

Heat 1 – 23 July

Heat 2 – 23 July

Heat 3 – 23 July

Final – 24 July

1500 meters
Final – 22 July

5000 meters
Final – 24 July

10,000 meters
Final – 22 July

Marathon
Final – 23 July

3000 meters steeplechase
Final – 23 July

110 meters hurdles

Heat 1 – 22 July
Wind: +0.8 m/s

Note: See introduction above for a discussion of the timing problems.

Heat 2 – 22 July
Wind: +0.8 m/s

Final – 22 July
Wind: +0.0 m/s

400 meters hurdles

Heat 1 – 24 July

Heat 2 – 24 July

Final – 24 July

High jump
Final – 23 July

Pole vault
Final – 24 July

Long jump
Final – 22 July

Triple jump
Final – 24 July

Shot put
Final – 23 July

Discus throw
Final – 24 July

Hammer throw
Final – 22 July

Javelin throw
Final – 24 July

20 kilometers walk
Final – 24 July

4 × 100 meters relay

Heat 1 – 23 July

†: Only the last name is known.  The full name was assigned tentatively.

Heat 2 – 23 July

Final – 24 July

4 × 400 meters relay
Final – 24 July

Women's results

100 meters

Heat 1 – 22 July
Wind: +1.7 m/s

Heat 2 – 22 July
Wind: +2.4 m/s

Final – 22 July
Wind: +0.0 m/s

Extra – 22 July
Wind: +0.0 m/s

200 meters

Heat 1 – 23 July
Wind: +0.0 m/s

Note: See introduction above for a discussion of the timing problems.

Heat 2 – 23 July
Wind: +0.0 m/s

Note: See introduction above for a discussion of the timing problems.

Heat 3 – 23 July
Wind: +0.3 m/s

Final – 23 July
Wind: +0.0 m/s

Extra – 23 July
Wind: +0.0 m/s

400 meters

Heat 1 – 22 July

†: Only the last name is known.  The full name was assigned tentatively.

Heat 2 – 22 July

Heat 3 – 22 July

Final – 22 July

800 meters

Heat 1 – 23 July

Heat 2 – 23 July

Final – 24 July

1500 meters
Final – 22 July

3000 meters
Final – 24 July

10,000 meters
Final – 23 July

Marathon
Final – 23 July

100 meters hurdles

Heat 1 – 23 July
Wind: +0.0 m/s

Heat 2 – 23 July
Wind: +0.0 m/s

Final – 23 July
Wind: +0.0 m/s

400 meters hurdles

Heat 1 – 24 July

Heat 2 – 24 July

Final – 24 July

High jump
Final – 22 July

Long jump
Final – 24 July

Shot put
Final – 24 July

Discus throw
Final – 22 July

Javelin throw
Final – 23 July

10,000 meters walk
Final – 22 July

4 × 100 meters relay
Final – 24 July

4 × 400 meters relay
Final – 24 July

References

Ibero-American Championships in Athletics
Events at the Ibero-American Championships in Athletics